is a vertically scrolling manic shooter arcade game developed by Raizing and published by Eighting in 1998. The player controls teams of flying jet bikes (Batriders) each with their own pilot; players can choose up to three of nine standard characters plus another 
nine unlockable characters from the previous games of Raizing Mahou Daisakusen and Battle Garegga. In 2022, the game was included as part of the Sega Astro City Mini V, a vertically-oriented variant of the Sega Astro City mini console, marking its first appearance outside the arcades.

Gameplay

Gameplay takes place across up to seven stages, with a varying number of bosses depending upon the player selection and whether certain hidden tasks have been performed during gameplay. During Advanced course, it is possible to fight as few as seven or as many as all eighteen of the game's bosses. Small and Large Shot powerups, Option powerups and medals drop frequently from popcorn enemies and fall down off the screen from where they spawn. Extra lives are granted every 1,500,000 points.

Pressing A fires the main Shot and, if the requisite powerups have been collected, the player's Options. Pressing B fires the Bomb and pressing nothing powers up the Aura, a small energy field at the front of the player which causes damage.

Batrider contains up to seven stages along with a large number of secrets, which are either unlockable with codes or DIP switch settings, or hidden within the game itself. In addition to selectable difficulty levels via dipswitch, there are also four player-selectable variants of the game:
Training course lasts for three stages; Manhattan City, one of the three Stage Edit stages below (unless left or right is held while selecting the course), and Highway. The game will automatically use any remaining bombs if the player takes a hit.
Normal course lasts for five stages; Manhattan City, Sky High/Airport/Sewage System in random order unless Stage Edit is enabled, and finally Highway, as well as Bashinet II's secret boss stage Colosseum, Mech-Bull in the stage Future Jungle and Gigant-Mech Goromaru JR in the stage Bangkok.
Advanced course is the full game of seven stages; the above, Zenovia City, and Building, as well as more secret boss stages, Black Heart II's Airport, Bashinet R's Night Flight, Glow Squid's Night View, God-Mech Saint George's Outer Space and Gigant Mech-Anakonda's Blue Hell.
Special course is a boss rush mode using the Advanced course versions of the bosses, with the same criteria determining which bosses are fought as the other modes. On Japanese versions, it must be enabled via dipswitch.

Plot
In the year 2014, Manhattan was plagued with unprecedented levels of crime. No measure of law enforcement seemed able to combat the strife and violence, and so a desperate plan was brought forth by GiganTech Cybertronics Corporation. This plan was the artificial island Zenovia, two kilometers south of Manhattan, which would be patrolled by GiganTech's own robotic creations. A rapid exodus from Manhattan to Zenovia resulted.

However, by 2019, the promise of tranquility has not been fulfilled. Even with all the expansions to Zenovia the population influx called for, it has become something of a slum, except for the massive GiganTech headquarters. There have been quarrels over whether or not Zenovia should be regarded as being the jurisdiction of the United States, or just GiganTech. Crime, amazingly, has grown even more rapidly than Manhattan ever knew—partly because the GiganTech machines have been promoting everything EXCEPT law and order. The most horrific aspect, though, is the result of an intelligence investigation from the government.

GiganTech's own executives, both then and now, are actually among the most dangerous criminals the country has ever known. Zenovia, far from being planned as a refuge from violence, was actually a trap and a testing ground for the weapons GiganTech plans to use to become the sole power of the underworld.

Neither police nor armies are willing to commit against the mechanical forces that GiganTech commands and invade Zenovia. Therefore, nine fighters—three police, three convicts, and three psychics—have been drafted as "Zero-Cops", riding the BatRider airbikes against the forces invading Manhattan and charging into Zenovia to take down GiganTech's CEO and his ultimate weapon, known only as "Discharge".

Reception
In Japan, Game Machine listed Armed Police Batrider on their March 15, 1998 issue as being the sixth most-successful arcade game of the month.

References

External links
Official website
Armed Police BatRider at Arcade History

1998 video games
Arcade video games
Cooperative video games
Eighting games
Japan-exclusive video games
Science fiction video games
Vertically scrolling shooters
Video games about police officers
Video games developed in Japan
Video games scored by Atsuhiro Motoyama
Video games scored by Hitoshi Sakimoto
Video games scored by Manabu Namiki
Video games featuring female protagonists
Video games set in 2019
Multiplayer and single-player video games